is a private music school in Toshima, Tokyo, Japan.

History 
The college moved to Toshima in Tokyo in 1924 after the original campus was destroyed by the Great Kantō earthquake.

Some notable graduates

Yuko Suzuhana - singer and leader of Wagakki Band
Junichi Hirokami – conductor
Yoko Maria – singer
Mahito Yokota – composer
Yasunori Nishiki – composer

External links
 

Educational institutions established in 1907
Universities and colleges in Tokyo
Music schools in Japan
Buildings and structures in Toshima
1907 establishments in Japan